The Border Patrol Police ((BPP) is a Thai paramilitary police under the jurisdiction of the Royal Thai Police, responsible for border security and counterinsurgency.

History
The Thai Border Patrol Police was organized in 1951 with assistance from the United States Central Intelligence Agency. Although technically part of the Royal Thai Police (RTP), the BPP has always enjoyed a great deal of autonomy within the national headquarters as well as in its field operations. The royal family was a principal patron of the organization. This traditional relationship benefited both the palace and its paramilitary protectors. In the past, many BPP commanders were former army officers. Nowadays, all BPP officers and commanders only have police background.

Organization

National Organization
Headquarters Border Patrol Police Bureau
General Staff Division
Special Training Division
Support Division
Police Aerial Reinforcement Unit (PARU)
Naresuan 261 Special Operation Unit
Village Scout Center
1st Border Patrol Police Regional Divisions. 
11th Border Patrol Police Regional
12th Border Patrol Police Regional
13th Border Patrol Police Regional
14th Border Patrol Police Regional
2nd Border Patrol Police Regional Divisions
21st Border Patrol Police Regional
22nd Border Patrol Police Regional
23rd Border Patrol Police Regional
24th Border Patrol Police Regional
3rd Border Patrol Police Regional Divisions
31st Border Patrol Police Regional
32nd Border Patrol Police Regional
33rd Border Patrol Police Regional
34th Border Patrol Police Regional
4th Border Patrol Police Regional Divisions
41st Border Patrol Police Regional
42nd Border Patrol Police Regional
43rd Border Patrol Police Regional
44th Border Patrol Police Regional

Field organization
Platoons of 32-men form the basic operating units of the BPP. Each platoon is supported by one or more heavy weapons platoons stationed at the regional and area RTP headquarters. PARU can airlift BPP platoons to troubled areas when an emergency arises. Armed with modern light infantry equipment, the BPP also benefited from training by United States Army Special Forces advisers who helped establish an instruction program during the 1960s.

The BPP served as an important adjunct to the Thai military and often operated under army (and sometimes the Royal Thai Marine Corps) control during counterinsurgency operations.

BPP units stationed along the Cambodian and Laotian borders following the Vietnamese invasion of Cambodia in 1979 often served as a first line of defense and bore the brunt of Vietnamese attacks.

In order to carry out its intelligence mission, the BPP operates numerous civic action programs to cultivate and maintain rapport with remote area villagers and hill tribes. They have built and operate schools in remote areas and help the army construct offices for civilian administration. They operate rural medical aid stations, give farmers agricultural assistance, and have built small airstrips.

Border Patrol Police Aerial Reinforcement Unit
The Border Patrol Police Parachute Aerial Resupply Unit (BPP PARU or PARU) is the BPP's special forces unit responsible for training and supporting airborne operations, airborne reinforcement, disaster and accident rescue, and supporting special missions under the command of the BPP. All members of PARU are trained for airborne operations, including free-fall jumps. PARU can provide support to BPP headquarters within two hours. The PARU in the 1950s and 1960s was a small unit used for clandestine missions outside Thailand. It was largely CIA-funded at that time. PARU's counts its founding from 27 April 1954, when King Bhumibol visited the opening ceremony of the PARU Company's Naresuan Camp in Hua Hin.

PARU also conducts training for the following:
 unconventional warfare, counter-terrorism, and parachute training of the Royal Thai Police.
 disaster and accident rescue on land and water including air-sea rescue.

Long Range Surveillance Unit 
The Border Patrol Police has a Long Range Surveillance unit. Under the Border Patrol Police Division 44, Phaya Lithai Camp, Yala Province, established training courses and set up a unit since 2010.

Subordinate paramilitary forces

Volunteer Defense Corps

The BPP organized the paramilitary Volunteer Defense Corps or VDC (the Or Sor) in 1954 to provide law and order and emergency response. This was done in response to complaints of banditry and harassment by subversive organizations. The VDC had the responsibility of protecting inhabitants from threats and intimidation by guerrillas who had infiltrated the border provinces from neighboring Laos, Cambodia, and Malaysia. Its mission is to deny insurgents access to food and other supplies that made villages and farms their targets. VDC members were trained by the BPP. In 1974 it was expanded by the Internal Security Operations Command (ISOC) to urban areas to fight left-wing political activism. In the late 1980s, VDC strength was estimated at 33,000, down from a peak of about 52,000 in 1980. Part of the reduction was absorbed by the formation of the Thahan Phran, a paramilitary unit formed to counter communist insurgents. They were reinvigorated and have played a role in the fighting the South Thailand insurgency since 2004.

Village Scouts

The BPP, together with the Ministry of Interior, backed and sponsored the 1971 establishment of the "Village Scouts", a right-wing rural vigilante group and paramilitary militia. The village scouts were to counter the communist insurgency and the pro-democracy movement of the 1970s. Soon after its creation, five million Thais (10 percent of the population) went through the organisation's initiation rite and took its five-day training course. The Village Scouts conducted the anti-leftist rally that led to the Thammasat University massacre and bloody coup d'état on 6 October 1976. The Village Scouts disappeared around 1981, but were revived around 2004 against the backdrop of the Muslim separatist conflict in south Thailand.

Thahan Phran

The 10,600 member Thahan Phran ("Rangers") was formed as a volunteer militia force deployed to active trouble spots along the Cambodian and Burmese borders. The paramilitary organization had 32 regiments and 196 companies. The Thahan Phran gained considerable publicity and incurred significant casualties during Vietnamese bombardments and local assaults along the Cambodian border. Since 2004, they have deployed to counter the South Thailand insurgency.

See also
 Royal Thai Police
 Naresuan 261 Counter-Terrorism Unit
 Internet censorship in Thailand
 Nawaphon

References

 CIA World Factbook page

External links

Official Royal Thai Police website 
English Information on the Royal Thai Police
 Border Patrol Police Subdivision 92 (PARU) Unofficial page 
 Border Patrol Police Airborne Reinforcement Unit (PARU) 

Law enforcement in Thailand
Paramilitary organizations based in Thailand
Thailand
Borders of Thailand
1950s establishments in Thailand
Royal Thai Police